Hebrews 10 is the tenth chapter of the Epistle to the Hebrews in the New Testament of the Christian Bible. The author is anonymous, although the internal reference to "our brother Timothy" (Hebrews 13:23) causes a traditional attribution to Paul, but this attribution has been disputed since the second century and there is no decisive evidence for the authorship. This chapter contains the exposition about Christ's effective sacrifice and the exhortation to continue in faithfulness and expectancy.

Text
The original text was written in Koine Greek. This chapter is divided into 39 verses.

Textual witnesses
Some early manuscripts containing the text of this chapter are:
Papyrus 46 (175–225; only missing verses 21 & 31)
Papyrus 13 (225-250; extant verses 8-22, 29-39)
Codex Vaticanus (325-350)
Codex Sinaiticus (330-360)
Codex Alexandrinus (400-440)
Codex Ephraemi Rescriptus (~450; extant verses 1-23)
Codex Freerianus (~450; extant verses 5-8,16-18,26-29,35-38)
Codex Claromontanus (~550)
Codex Coislinianus (~550; extant verses 1–7, 32–38)
Papyrus 79 (7th century; extant verses 10-12, 28-30)

Old Testament references
: Psalm 
 : Jeremiah 31:33
 : Jeremiah 31:34
 : ; Psalm a
 Hebrews 10:38:

The True Sacrifice (10:1–10)
Attridge sees the final stage of Jeremiah 31 exposition to indicate that "Christ inaugurated the new and interior covenant by an act of conformity to God's will".

Verse 4
For it is not possible for the blood of bulls and goats to take away sins.
This is one of the four things to be 'impossible' according to this epistle (Hebrews 6:4; 6:18; 10:4; 11:6).

Verse 5
That is why, when Christ[a] came into the world, he said to God,You did not want animal sacrifices or sin offerings. But you have given me a body to offerVerse 10By that will we have been sanctified through the offering of the body of Jesus Christ once for all.It is the will of God that the believers be sanctified (cf. 1 Thessalonians 4:3) and Christ's act of obedience made God's will his own, because Christ's death conformed to God's will (Galatians 1:4; Ephesians 1:5–11; 1 Peter 3:17) and Christ's obedience—attested in the Gethsemane story (Matthew 26:42; Luke 22:42) and the fourth gospel (John 4:34; 5:30; 6:38–40; 19:30—is decisive for establishing the new covenant.

It is the first time in the epistle that the composite name 'Jesus Christ' appears (cf. Hebrews 13:8).

Summation (10:11–18)
This section weaves together the themes of the previous few chapters.

Verse 14For by one offering He has perfected forever those who are being sanctified."By one offering": By his one sacrifice Jesus Christ did what the law of Moses, and all its sacrifices, could not do.
"Those who are being sanctified" by God the Father and set apart by him in internal election.

Hold Fast to Faith (10:19–24)

Warning and Encouragement (10:24–39)

Verses 26-31 reference the unforgivable sin according to theologians, such as John Wesley. The encouragement in verse 32-29 balances the threat or warning in verses 24-31.

"Tarry": Delay.

Verse 38"Now the just shall live by faith; But if anyone draws back, My soul has no pleasure in him."Cited from the LXX version of Habakkuk 2:4 which reads:If he shrinks back, my soul has no pleasure in him, but the righteous one will live by faith.Here "he shrinks back" is not applied to the "coming one" but to "those who await God's deliverance."

Paul also cites Habakkuk 2:4 in Galatians 3:11 and Romans 1:17 to contrast "faith" and "works of the law".

Verse 39But we are not of those who draw back to perdition, but of those who believe to the saving of the soul.Cross reference: Luke 17
"Perdition": or "destruction".

See also
 High priest
 Jesus Christ
 Moses
 Tabernacle
 Related Bible parts: Exodus 25, Deuteronomy 32, Joshua 10, Psalm 40, Psalm 110, Jeremiah 31; Habakkuk 2, Acts 2, Acts 5; Romans 1, Romans 8; Hebrews 1

References

Bibliography

External links
 King James Bible - Wikisource
English Translation with Parallel Latin Vulgate
Online Bible at GospelHall.org (ESV, KJV, Darby, American Standard Version, Bible in Basic English)
Multiple bible versions at Bible Gateway (NKJV, NIV, NRSV etc.)

10